In enzymology, a procollagen glucosyltransferase is an enzyme that catalyzes the chemical reaction

UDP-glucose + 5-(D-galactosyloxy)-L-lysine-procollagen  UDP + 1,2-D-glucosyl-5-D-(galactosyloxy)-L-lysine-procollagen

Thus, the two substrates of this enzyme are UDP-glucose and 5-(D-galactosyloxy)-L-lysine-procollagen, whereas its two products are UDP and 1,2-D-glucosyl-5-D-(galactosyloxy)-L-lysine-procollagen.

This enzyme belongs to the family of glycosyltransferases, specifically the hexosyltransferases.  The systematic name of this enzyme class is UDP-glucose:5-(D-galactosyloxy)-L-lysine-procollagen D-glucosyltransferase. Other names in common use include galactosylhydroxylysine glucosyltransferase, collagen glucosyltransferase, collagen hydroxylysyl glucosyltransferase, galactosylhydroxylysyl glucosyltransferase, UDP-glucose-collagenglucosyltransferase, and uridine diphosphoglucose-collagen glucosyltransferase.

References

 
 
 
 

EC 2.4.1
Enzymes of unknown structure